The 1967 South American Basketball Championship for Women was the 11th instance of the tournament. The host city was Cali, Colombia. The winners were Brazil, who won their fourth title to date and second consecutive title.

Tournament 
The tournament was held in a single round robin format among the seven competing teams. Brazil won all six of their games.

Results

Games

References

South
B
South American Basketball Championship for Women
October 1967 sports events in South America
November 1967 sports events in South America
Bask